Köwerich is a municipality in the Trier-Saarburg district, in Rhineland-Palatinate, Germany.

References

Trier-Saarburg